The Shanghai Maglev Museum is a museum that highlights the history of the Shanghai Maglev Train and other related maglevs. Opened in 2007, it is located at the Longyang Road station of the Shanghai Maglev in Shanghai, China.

Sections 
The museum is composed of five sections. The sections are "Birth of the Maglev," "Maglev Shanghai Line," "Maglev Technology," "Maglev Superiorities," and "Prospects For The Maglev." The museum has interactive exhibits including Transrapid Assemble Game, and Cycling. The museum has many models of the Shanghai Maglev.

 The section named "Birth of the Maglev" describes how the maglev technologies were started. It includes models of the first maglevs.
 The section named "Maglev Shanghai Line" describes the history of the Shanghai Maglev. Many models are located in this section.
 The section named "Maglev Technology" describes the modern technology of the maglev.
 The section named "Maglev Superiorities" describes the advantages of the maglev.
 The section named "Prospects For The Maglev" describes the future of the maglev. The interactive Transrapid Assemble Game and Cycling are located in this exhibit.

Gift shop 
The museum has a gift shop where the souvenirs are exhibited on the platform of the maglev and you pay at the museum ticket desk.

Opening 
The museum was opened on 16 August 2007.

References

External links
 Shanghai Maglev Museum - official site

Museums in Shanghai
Railway museums in China
Museums established in 2007
2007 establishments in China